Minifootball is a small-sided variation of football. It is mainly played in 5-a-side format, with additional types of 6-a-side, 7-a-side, 8-a-side, 9-a-side and indoor soccer, all played on astro turf, or futsal played indoors on a hard court. The highest world authority of 5-a-side format is World Minifootball Federation, International Socca Federation of 6-a-side format, and several sub-continental bodies of 7-a-side format, including IFA7 and FIF7. Over the years, the popularity of minifootball has increased globally.

The term minifootball means small sided football open for both professional and recreational players. WMF organizes own World Cup every 2 years, as well as continental championships through established national federations. Using its feeds, WMF creates ways to increase the number of spectators in football stadiums and, together with activation of its membership base, increases value of football towards its partners.

References

Further reading
RULES OF THE GAME MINIFOOTBALL

 
Association football variants